Chingunji may refer to the following political leaders of Angola's UNITA rebel movement
David Chingunji (died 1970), top commander, son of Kafundanga
Dinho Chingunji (born 1964), son of Kafundanga, brother of David
Kafundanga Chingunji (died 1974), first Chief of Staff
Tito Chingunji (died 1991), foreign secretary